Wojciech Jagoda (born 20 April 1962) is a Polish retired footballer and sport journalist, who has worked in Canal+ Sport since 2013.

Club career
Jagoda started his senior career with Legia Warsaw in the Polish Ekstraklasa, where he made thirty-one appearances and scored one goal. After that, he played for Hutnik Warsaw, West Adelaide SC, Adelaide Raiders SC, Tanjong Pagar United, SV 1922 Emmingen ab Egg, and Polonia Warsaw.

References

External links
 

Polish footballers
Polish sports journalists
Polonia Warsaw players
Legia Warsaw players
1962 births
Living people
Association football midfielders
Association football defenders